The 2007 NBL season was the 26th season of the National Basketball League. The Nelson Giants won the championship in 2007 to claim their third league title.

Summary

Regular season standings

Playoff bracket

Awards

Statistics leaders
Stats as of the end of the regular season

Regular season
 Most Valuable Player: Josh Pace (Nelson Giants)
 NZ Most Valuable Player: Link Abrams (Taranaki Mountainairs) & Paora Winitana (Hawke's Bay Hawks)
 Most Outstanding Guard: Josh Pace (Nelson Giants)
 Most Outstanding NZ Guard: Hayden Allen (Harbour Heat) & Lindsay Tait (Auckland Stars)
 Most Outstanding Forward: Link Abrams (Taranaki Mountainairs)
 Most Outstanding NZ Forward/Centre: Link Abrams (Taranaki Mountainairs)
 Scoring Champion: Garry Hill-Thomas (Taranaki Mountainairs)
 Rebounding Champion: Link Abrams (Taranaki Mountainairs)
 Assist Champion: Paul Henare (Hawke's Bay Hawks)
 Rookie of the Year: Charlie Piho (Auckland Stars)
 Coach of the Year: John Dorge (Harbour Heat)
 All-Star Five:
 G: Lindsay Tait (Auckland Stars)
 G: Josh Pace (Nelson Giants)
 F: Dillon Boucher (Auckland Stars)
 F: Oscar Forman (Harbour Heat)
 C: Link Abrams (Taranaki Mountainairs)

References

External links
Basketball New Zealand 2007 Results Annual
Basketball New Zealand 2007 Annual Report
2007 League Handbook
2007 Round 15
Round 14 POW
Round 15 POW
SF POW

National Basketball League (New Zealand) seasons
NBL